Marilyn Minter (born 1948) is an American visual artist who is perhaps best known for her sensual paintings and photographs done in the photorealism style that blur the line between commercial and fine art. Minter currently teaches in the MFA department at the School of Visual Arts in New York City.

Early life and education
Minter was born in Shreveport, Louisiana, in 1948. She was raised in Florida.

In 1970 she attained a BFA from the University of Florida in Gainesville. In 1972 she received an MFA in painting from Syracuse University.

Style
Her photographs and works often include sexuality and erotic imagery. Minter's process begins by staging photoshoots with film. She eschews digital manipulation, instead favoring a conventional darkroom process for developing stills. She does not crop or digitally manipulate her photographs. Her paintings, on the other hand, are made by combining negatives in photoshop to make a whole new image. This new image is then turned into paintings created through the layering of enamel paint on aluminum.  Minter and her assistants work directly from this newly created digital image. The last layer is applied with fingertips to create a modeling or softening of the paintbrush lines.

Career
Minter's career began while she was a student at the University of Florida, where she created a series of photographic studies involving her drug-addicted mother with the guidance of Diane Arbus. Minter later moved to New York City in 1976, after earning a master of fine arts degree at Syracuse University, and began collaborating with the German expressionist painter Christof Kohlhofer. Through the 1980s, she explored Pop-derived pictures often incorporating sexuality, setting the tone for many of her works. Although their joint work gained critical acclaim, when their 1984 and 1986 shows at the Gracie Mansion gallery were not commercially successful, Kohlhofer and Minter parted ways.

In 1989 Minter questioned the subject matter of women artists, and why women did not address pornography in their work. The result of Minter's exploration is Porn Grid, a series of 4 panels each showcasing in graphic detail scenes of the act of fellatio, one performed by a mustachioed male, in ben-day dots like the magnified colors from the funny pages, the imagery largely obtained from "men's magazines."  The feminist community did not embrace her work. She was initially accused of being in collusion with the porn industry when in fact, Minter was pushing the boundaries of the kind of work women artists could create. Minter told Artforum in 2015 "I was shocked by the negative reaction to those works at the time. I was accused of being complicit in sexism and was stunned by the idea that a woman owning sexual imagery could be taken so negatively." Minter is quick to point out that sexually provocative imagery carries negative blowback for young women artists in particular.  "If you’re a young woman artist and you’re working with sexual imagery, it makes people crazy. But they’ll love it if you’re old."

In 1990, Minter produced her first video, 100 Food Porn, shot and directed by NY documentary filmmaker Ted Haimes. This video was used as a television advertisement to promote her exhibition at the Simon Watson Gallery in New York. Minter used the gallery's art advertising budget to buy 30 second slots on Late Night with David Letterman in lieu of traditional print advertising, becoming the first artist to advertise an artists' exhibition on late night television. Through the 1990s she refined her works. While still having pornographic undertones, they began to exude a sense of glamour and high-fashion. In 1998, Minter received a prestigious Guggenheim Fellowship for Fine Arts.

In 2003, she was in the exhibition 4 Walls, 8 Views at the Arena Gallery founded by Art curator Renee Riccardo in New York, NY. In 2005 Minter had a solo exhibition, titled New Work: Marilyn Minter, at the San Francisco Museum of Modern Art, focused on hyperrealistic close-ups of seemingly glamorous images, including makeup-laden lips, eyes, and toes. The following year Minter was featured in the Whitney Bienniale, and in a partnership with Creative Time, was given ad space on four billboards in Manhattan's Chelsea district. The billboards presented photographs of high heels kicking around in dirty water, and stayed up for a month.

Minter's first retrospective monograph was published in 2007. Her book involved a heavy gloss, multi-colored paper making it feel almost wet, setting the book apart. This same year, she had shows in Sweden, the U.K., Spain, and France. In 2007, Minter also produced a series of photographs of the actress Pamela Anderson, commissioned by the art quarterly Parkett.

In 2008, Minter collaborated with international skate/street wear brand Supreme to produce three limited edition skate decks. In 2009 she produced the video Green Pink Caviar. Lush and sensual, the video depicts a series of tongues, covered in candy, that "paint" across a glass surface. The video was later shown in Times Square in New York City. Excerpts of the video were used as the backdrop for the opening song in Madonna's Sticky & Sweet Tour. In 2010 the video was exhibited at the Museum of Modern Art.

In 2014, Minter published a 500 limited edition book called PLUSH, which is a compilation 70 photographs of female pubic hair. In April 2015 Marilyn Minter opened her first major retrospective at the Contemporary Arts Museum Houston. This exhibition is made up of paintings from between 1976 and 2013. The exhibit is titled Pretty/Dirty, and includes some of her early work, such as Little Girls #1 and Big Girls from her collection Big Girls/Little Girls. Minter's Pretty/Dirty exhibition is the first time all of these pieces of work can be seen together in one museum. The exhibit was co-curated by Bill Arning and Elissa Auther. This collection travelled around the nation until 2017, including the Orange County Museum of Art, near Los Angeles. This retrospective display of her work incorporated many different developmental stages of her career.

Marilyn Minter: Pretty/Dirty was also presented by the Brooklyn Museum, from November 4, 2016 – May 7, 2017. The exhibition was part of A Year of Yes: Reimagining Feminism at the Brooklyn Museum, a series of exhibitions and public programs presenting various perspectives on the history of feminism and feminist art, celebrating the 10th anniversary of the Elizabeth A. Sackler Center for Feminist Art.

Since the beginning of her career Minter published in numerous popular American magazines and networks. She most recently she began creating enamel on metal paintings with a  signature silver liquid. Some of Minter's past exhibitions have centered around up close images of flaws, cracked feet, glitter, glam, and all them incorporate a layered look that draws the eyes attention with its depth.

In 2018 Minter collaborated with For Freedoms, an artist-run platform for civic engagement, to create a billboard poster for the 50 State Initiative, a major billboard campaign that aims to encourage political participation and voting. Displayed in Little Rock, Arkansas, Minter's billboard resembles graffiti, with the word “sad!” in red, blue, and purple spray paint. Minter intended for her billboard to criticize Donald Trump, stating, "I couldn’t be political, but I would have been really aggressive if I could...This is as mild as I could get. Taking one of his signature words and trying to re-purpose it into a really sad-looking word."

The 50 State Initiative was deeply personal to Minter. She stated, “I think it’s important for everyone to get involved, not just artists. If you’re not upset, you’re not awake,” she said. “I just can’t tolerate injustice, but who can? I just don’t ignore it, and that’s really it.”

Minter's work was included in the 2022 exhibition Women Painting Women at the Modern Art Museum of Fort Worth.

Select exhibitions
Minter has been the subject of numerous solo exhibitions, including:
 New Work: Marilyn Minter, San Francisco Museum of Modern Art (2005)
 Marilyn Minter: Chewing Color, Contemporary Arts Center, Cincinnati (2009)
 Marilyn Minter, Deichtorhallen (2010)
 Marilyn Minter: Orange Crush, Museum of Contemporary Art Cleveland (2010)
 Marilyn Minter: Pretty/Dirty, Contemporary Arts Museum Houston (2015)

Representation 
Minter is represented by the following galleries: Salon94 in New York, Regen Projects in Los Angeles, and Baldwin Gallery in Aspen.

Bibliography
 Marilyn Minter, Gregory R. Miller & Co., 2007

References

External links
 Green Pink Caviar Marilyn Minter: Green Pink Caviar
 Salon 94 Marilyn Minter's Gallery: Salon 94
 CREATIVETIME: Marilyn Minter Billboard Project
 Parkett (Issue #79) by Andrea K. Scott, Cay Sophie Rabinowitz and Katy Siegel
 Time out New York: A Matter of Time (Issue 669: Jul 22-30,  2008) by Howard Halle
 ARTnews: Slides and Prejudice (April 2006) by Linda Yablonsky
 Profile of Marilyn Minter at Smyles & Fish
 What it Feels Like to Look: A Studio Visit with Marilyn Minter by Emily Davidow

1948 births
Living people
American contemporary artists
American pop artists
Artists from Florida
People from Shreveport, Louisiana
Artists from New York (state)
University of Florida alumni
Syracuse University College of Visual and Performing Arts alumni